Jake and the Fatman is an American crime drama television series starring William Conrad as prosecutor J. L. (Jason Lochinvar) "Fatman" McCabe and Joe Penny as investigator Jake Styles. The series ran on CBS for five seasons from September 26, 1987, to May 6, 1992. Diagnosis: Murder was a spin-off of this series.

Plot
J. L. "Fatman" McCabe is a Hawaii-born, tough former Honolulu Police Department officer turned Los Angeles district attorney. He is teamed with a handsome, happy-go-lucky special investigator named Jake Styles. They often clash due to their different styles and personalities. "Fatman" travels hardly anywhere without Max, his pet bulldog. The show was set in Los Angeles during the first season. After the end of Magnum, P.I., the show was moved to Hawaii. The second and third seasons and half of the fourth season were filmed in Honolulu. The show then returned to Los Angeles for the remainder of its run.

Cast

Main cast
William Conrad as District Attorney J. L. "Fatman" McCabe
Joe Penny as Detective Jake Styles
Alan Campbell as Assistant District Attorney Derek Mitchell

Recurring guest stars
Lu Leonard as Gertrude
Jack Hogan as Judge Smithwood
Melody Anderson as Sergeant Neely Capshaw

Guest stars on the series included Alex Cord, Robert Culp, Denise Dowse, Scott Marlowe, Leigh McCloskey, Ed Nelson, Leo Penn, Stephen Quadros, Robert Reed, Mitch Ryan, David Soul and Ray Sharkey.

Production

Development
Conrad guest starred as an aging prosecutor in a two-part episode of Matlock during its first season on NBC. Executive producers Fred Silverman and Dean Hargrove decided to use this character as a model for one of the main characters in a new show they were creating for CBS. Penny also guest starred in these episodes, but his character was not on the same side as Conrad's character in the storyline's legal case.

Following the departure of Hargrove, executive producers David Moessinger and Jeri Taylor were brought on to run the series with Silverman. They also hired J. Michael Straczynski as an executive story consultant. Taylor and Moessinger ran the show for two years before finally leaving in a dispute over control over the show.

Straczynski has written that he was hired after pitching a story that let Conrad sit down for almost every scene, noting his own faux slogan for the show "Jake and the Fatman: He can't act, he can't walk, together they fight crime".

Controversy
Joe Penny lost a large amount of weight after the show moved to Hawaii, which led to many rumors about his health, including the possibility that he had AIDS. In actuality, he had suffered from a gastrointestinal virus and was having difficulty regaining the weight he lost. When the show moved back to Los Angeles, it was also suspected that it was on Penny's urging. This was also not true, as the move was CBS's decision.

Episodes

Jake and the Fatman had a total of five seasons and 106 episodes that were broadcast on CBS between 1987 and 1992.

Home media
CBS DVD (distributed by Paramount) released the first two seasons of Jake and the Fatman on DVD in Region 1 between 2008/2009.  As of June 2015, these releases have been discontinued and are out of print.

Visual Entertainment released Jake and the Fatman - The Complete Collection on June 23, 2017.

Jake and the Fatman - The Complete Collection is rated PG in New Zealand for Violence, coarse language & drug references

Spin-offs

The nineteenth episode of the fourth season of Jake and the Fatman, "It Never Entered My Mind", featured Dick Van Dyke as Dr. Mark Sloan, a medical doctor who solves crimes. The success of that episode led initially to a series of three TV movies, and then a weekly television series Diagnosis: Murder that debuted on CBS on October 29, 1993.

References

External links

1987 American television series debuts
1992 American television series endings
1980s American crime drama television series
1990s American crime drama television series
1980s American legal television series
1990s American legal television series
CBS original programming
Fictional portrayals of the Honolulu Police Department
English-language television shows
Television duos
Television series by CBS Studios
Television shows set in Los Angeles
Television shows set in Hawaii
Television shows filmed in Hawaii
Television series about prosecutors